The Sack of Rome (Italian: Il Sacco di Roma) is a 1920 Italian silent historical film directed by Enrico Guazzoni and Giulio Aristide Sartorio. The film portrays the 1527 Sack of Rome.

Cast
 Beppo Corradi 
 Tullio Ferri 
 Irma Julians 
 Ida Magrini 
 Giuseppe Majone Diaz 
 Silvia Malinverni 
 Haydee Mercatali 
 Livio Pavanelli 
 Carlo Simoneschi 
 Raimondo Van Riel

References

Sources 
 Moliterno, Gino. Historical Dictionary of Italian Cinema. Scarecrow Press, 2008.

External links 
 

1920 films
Italian historical drama films
Italian silent feature films
1920s Italian-language films
Films directed by Enrico Guazzoni
1920s historical drama films
Films set in Rome
Italian black-and-white films
1920 drama films
Silent historical drama films
1920s Italian films